Aldo von Pinelli (1913–1967) was an Italian screenwriter, lyricist and film producer.

Selected filmography
 Cause for Divorce (1937)
 A Girl from the Chorus (1937)
 The Singing House (1948)
 No Sin on the Alpine Pastures (1950)
 Homesick for You  (1952)
 Southern Nights (1953)
 Hit Parade (1953)
 The First Kiss (1954)
 Request Concert (1955)
 The Big Chance (1957)
 Escape from Sahara (1958)
 Freddy, the Guitar and the Sea (1959)
 Conny and Peter Make Music (1960)
 Freddy and the Melody of the Night (1960)
 Zärtliche Haie (1967)

References

Bibliography 
 Fritsche, Maria. Homemade Men in Postwar Austrian Cinema: Nationhood, Genre and Masculinity. Berghahn Books, 2013.

External links

1913 births
1967 deaths
20th-century Italian screenwriters
Italian male screenwriters
Italian film producers
People from Lazio
20th-century Italian male writers